Navneet Virk (born 23 October 1996) is an Indian cricketer. He made his first-class debut on 9 December 2019, for Railways in the 2019–20 Ranji Trophy. He made his Twenty20 debut on 10 January 2021, for Railways in the 2020–21 Syed Mushtaq Ali Trophy.

References

External links
 

1996 births
Living people
Indian cricketers
Railways cricketers
Place of birth missing (living people)